Jagat Prakash Nadda (born 2 December 1960) is an Indian lawyer and politician serving as the president of the Bharatiya Janata Party (BJP) since 20 January 2020. He was the BJP's working president from June 2019 to January 2020. 
 
Nadda is the former Union Minister of Health and Family Welfare, and member of Rajya Sabha from Himachal Pradesh and Parliamentary Board Secretary of Bharatiya Janata Party. Earlier, he was a Minister in Himachal Pradesh Government.

Personal life
Nadda was born on 2 December 1960 in Patna, Bihar in the family of Narain Lall Nadda and Krishna Nadda, with roots in Himachal Pradesh. He has a brother named Jagat Bhushan Nadda. 

Nadda was educated at St. Xavier's School, Patna. Thereafter he did his B.A. from Patna College, Patna University and LL.B. from Faculty of Law, Himachal Pradesh University, Shimla. As a child, he represented Bihar in the All India Junior Swimming Championship held at Delhi. Nadda married Mallika Nadda (née Banerjee) on 11 December 1991, with whom he has two sons. His mother-in-law Jayashree Banerjee was elected to Lok Sabha in 1999.

Political career

Nadda was first elected to the Himachal Pradesh Legislative Assembly in the election of 1993 from Bilaspur. He was re-elected in 1998.

During his first term, he served as the Leader of his party group in the Himachal Pradesh Legislative Assembly, from 1994 to 1998. He was the Minister of Health and Family Welfare and Parliamentary Affairs during his second term.

Nadda was elected for another term in the 2007 elections. After Prem Kumar Dhumal formed a government, he inducted Nadda into his cabinet, as cabinet minister responsible for Forest, Environment, Science and Technology, from 2008 to 2010.

Nadda did not seek re-election to the Legislative Assembly in 2012, and instead got elected to Rajya Sabha, Indian Parliament's upper chamber. In 2014, during a cabinet reshuffle, Prime Minister Narendra Modi made Nadda, the Minister of Health.

Nadda was appointed the national working president of the BJP in June 2019. On 20 January 2020, he was elected unanimously as the BJP National President, a role he took from Amit Shah.

In January 2021 in Bardhaman, West Bengal, Nadda started a new scheme Ek Muthi Chaawal Yojana. In September 2022 he got extension to be the party chief till 2024 Lok Sabha polls.

References

External links

1960 births
Living people
Patna University alumni
St. Xavier's Patna alumni
Rajya Sabha members from Himachal Pradesh
Health ministers of India
Bharatiya Janata Party politicians from Himachal Pradesh
Narendra Modi ministry
People from Bilaspur, Himachal Pradesh
State cabinet ministers of Himachal Pradesh
Presidents of Bharatiya Janata Party
Himachal Pradesh University alumni
Himachal Pradesh MLAs 1993–1998
Himachal Pradesh MLAs 1998–2003
Himachal Pradesh MLAs 2007–2012